The 1990 Brisbane Rugby League season was the 69th season of semi-professional top level rugby league in Brisbane, Queensland, Australia.

Teams 

Source:

Final 
Northern Suburbs 17 (P. Shields, M. Fiechtner, P. Coyne tries; P. Coyne 2 goals; P. Coyne field goal) defeated Fortitude Valley 16 (I. McKenzie, T. Evans tries; G Harvey 4 goals) at Lang Park.

Brawl
Early in th first half, a major brawl broke out between the two sides after a couple of heavy tackles. The fight initially seemed to calm before rapidly escalating and splintering into smaller fights. One of particular note was between Valleys winger Peter Shields and Norths threequarter Brad Foster, which saw the two trade blows toe to toe, and both lose their jerseys as a result. 

The fight was so ferocious that the scoreboard attendant displayed 'break it up lads' on the scoreboard, whilst there were two fight calls reputed as being triggered most likely by renowned Norths coach Tommy Raudonikis, with these being "99" and "ANZAC" respectively.

References 

Rugby league in Brisbane
Brisbane Rugby League season